Albanian Supercup 2002 is the ninth edition of the Albanian Supercup since its establishment in 1989. The match was contested between the Albanian Cup 2002 winners KF Tirana and the 2001–02 Albanian Superliga champions Dinamo Tirana.

KF Tirana thrashed the blue team by 6-0, this being the biggest win so far in an Albanian Supercup final.

Match details

See also
 2001–02 Albanian Superliga
 2001–02 Albanian Cup

References

RSSSF.com

2002
Supercup
Albanian Supercup, 2002
Albanian Supercup, 2002